Dafydd Hewitt (born 21 August 1985) is a retired Welsh rugby union player.

A centre, from Llantwit Major RFC he played at every level for his local club before stepping up to regional rugby in 2004 with the Cardiff Blues. He was selected for the Wales national rugby sevens team squad in 2007. Hewitt captained Wales Under 21s at the 2006 Under 21 Rugby World Championship. Hewitt's brother Rhys plays at hooker for Bridgend Ravens.

Having been selected as one of four club Vice Captains for 2012/13 season, after making only two appearances in 2014–15 season, Hewitt retired in April 2015 on medical advice due to a persistent neck injury.

References

External links
 
 

1985 births
Living people
Rugby union players from Cardiff
Llantwit Major RFC players
Cardiff Rugby players
Welsh rugby union players
Rugby union centres